Rodney Alexander Atkinson (born 7 August 1948) is a former Australian Liberal Party politician who represented the Division of Isaacs in the House of Representatives from 1990 to 1996.

Atkinson served in the Australian Army from 1968 to 1975, serving with the 8th Battalion Royal Australian Regiment in Singapore and Malaysia from 1968 to 1969, and in Vietnam from 1969 to 1970. He was awarded the Vietnam Medal, Vietnam Campaign Medal and Vietnam Gallantry Cross with Palm.

From 1980 to 1988 Atkinson was a Councillor on the City of Mordialloc Council, including a stint as Mayor from 1985 to 1986.

Atkinson was elected to represent the Division of Isaacs in Victoria in the 1990 federal election and re-elected in 1993. While in parliament he acted as Opposition Whip from 7 April 1993 to 26 May 1994.  He lost the seat to Labor candidate Greg Wilton in the 1996 federal election, largely due to a redistribution that turned his already marginal seat into a notional Labor seat.

References

1948 births
Living people
Liberal Party of Australia members of the Parliament of Australia
Members of the Australian House of Representatives
Members of the Australian House of Representatives for Isaacs
Australian Army soldiers
20th-century Australian politicians
Australian military personnel of the Vietnam War
Politicians from Adelaide